Aleksandr Valeryevich Reva (born 25 February 1970) is a former Russian football player.

Club career
He made his Russian Premier League debut for FC Dynamo-Gazovik Tyumen on 29 April 1992 in a game against FC Tekstilshchik Kamyshin. He also played on the top tier in the 1994 season.

References

1970 births
People from Kurgan, Kurgan Oblast
Living people
Soviet footballers
Russian footballers
Association football midfielders
FC Tobol Kurgan players
FC Tyumen players
FC Neftyanik Ufa players
FC Kristall Smolensk players
FC Iskra Smolensk players
Russian Premier League players
Sportspeople from Kurgan Oblast